Crime Reporter Holm is a 1932 German mystery film directed by Erich Engels and starring Hermann Speelmans, Elga Brink and Julius Falkenstein. It was shot at the Johannisthal Studios in Berlin. The film's sets were designed by the art directors Willi Herrmann and Herbert Lippschitz. Location shooting took place around Garmisch-Partenkirchen in Bavaria.

Cast
 Hermann Speelmans as Peter Holm
 Julius Falkenstein as Professor Caesar Cicero Nebelthau
 Elga Brink as Carla Garden, Tänzerin
 Anny Schwarz as Marie
 Harry Hardt
 Erik Wirl
 Alfred Beierle
 Hugo Flink
 Gerhard Bienert
 Gerhard Dammann
 Karl Klöckner
 Ossy Kratz-Corell

References

Bibliography 
 James Robert Parish & Kingsley Canham. Film Directors Guide: Western Europe. Scarecrow Press, 1976.

External links 
 

1932 films
1932 mystery films
Films of the Weimar Republic
German mystery films
1930s German-language films
Films directed by Erich Engels
German black-and-white films
1930s German films
Films shot at Johannisthal Studios